Heidi Hilgartner Sampson is a Republican politician, anti-vaccine activist and member of the Maine House of Representatives. Sampson represents Maine House District #21, consisting of the towns of Alfred and Newfield and parts of the towns of Limerick, Parsonsfield and Shapleigh. Sampson's prominence in the anti-vaccination movement in Maine began with her 2019 opposition toward legislation eliminating religious and philosophical exemptions to childhood vaccinations in the state. Sampson was active in a campaign for a failed people's veto of the legislation, and spoke at anti-vaccine rallies and events throughout the United States. During the COVID-19 pandemic, Sampson was a vocal opponent of public health measures taken to limit the spread of the pandemic in Maine, participating in rallies and demonstrations against business closures, gathering limits, mask wearing and vaccinations. Sampson has made comparisons of vaccine and mask mandates to Nazi atrocities during the Holocaust.

Early life and education
Sampson grew up in a military family and attended Gould Academy, graduating in 1977. She received a Bachelor of Science in 1981 from St. Lawrence University and worked in Maine as a field researcher for the New England Aquarium in 1982-83. In 2012, Maine Governor Paul LePage appointed Sampson to the Maine State Board of Education as a homeschool advocate.

Maine House of Representatives
Sampson first ran for the Maine House of Representatives in 2016, replacing independent incumbent James Campbell, who did not seek re-election. She was re-elected in both 2018 and 2020. During the 130th Maine state legislature (2021-2022) Sampson voted N0 against issues involving Wabanaki Rights, including LD 906: An Act To Provide Passamaquoddy Tribal Members Access to Clean Drinking Water, and LD 585: An Act To Enhance Tribal-State Collaboration, To Revise the Tax Laws Regarding the Houlton Band of Maliseet Indians, the Passamaquoddy Tribe and the Penobscot Nation and To Authorize Casinos, Off-track Betting Facilities, Federally Recognized Indian Tribes and Certain Commercial Tracks To Conduct Sports Wagering. Sampson did not vote on LD 1626: An Act Implementing the Recommendations of the Task Force on Changes to the Maine Indian Claims Settlement Implementing Act.

Anti-vaccine activism
Sampson was a prominent opponent of 2019 state legislation to eliminate religious and philosophical exemptions to school-required vaccinations in Maine. In her testimony opposing the bill, Sampson likened childhood vaccination to Russian roulette. When the bill passed into law, she joined state anti-vaccine activists in an effort to collect enough voter signatures for a people's veto of the new legislation to appear on a statewide ballot. The group successfully collected the signatures, and Sampson spoke at a November 2019 "Vaccine Injury Epidemic Event" rally in Washington, D.C. to promote and celebrate the veto's advancement. Sampson herself collected over 1,000 signatures for the veto campaign during the summer of 2019. The veto attempt failed 73%-27%.

Sampson was a headlined speaker at a July 2021 event in Belfast, Maine co-sponsored by conspiracy theorist and Holocaust denier Robert David Steele. During the event, Sampson promoted an audit of Maine's presidential election results and urged attendees to continue participating in protests against COVID-19 mitigation measures such as masking, lockdowns and vaccination. Sampson came under fire from several groups, including a Bangor synagogue, the Anti-Defamation League and a group of 53 of her fellow state legislators, for her participation in an event co-sponsored by Steele.

COVID-19 response
Throughout the global COVID-19 pandemic, Sampson opposed public health measures implemented in Maine to reduce the spread of COVID-19 in the state. In March 2021, she joined several other plaintiffs in a lawsuit asking a U.S. District Court judge to declare Governor Janet Mills' emergency declarations to be unconstitutional.

Sampson made national headlines after an appearance at an August 2021 rally opposing mandated COVID-19 vaccinations for healthcare workers in Maine. During her appearance, she likened the behavior of state officials, including Mills, to that of prominent Nazis in the Holocaust:

In the same speech, Sampson also suggested that the statewide vaccine mandate for healthcare workers violated the Nuremberg Code, comparing it to the Tuskegee Syphilis Study and suggesting that officials behind such mandates can be executed.

Personal life
Sampson lives in Alfred, Maine with her husband Robert. She has three children and two grandchildren. In October 2020, Sampson's neighbors, Sasha and Christopher Malone, filed a lawsuit in York County Superior Court claiming that Sampson and Robert clear-cut more than 4,300 trees from the Malones' property, a protected woodland, and built several structures on the land.

Electoral history

2020

2018

2016

References

External links
Heidi Sampson on Facebook
Heidi Sampson speaks at The Vaccine Injury Event, November 2019

Living people
21st-century American politicians
21st-century American women politicians
Republican Party members of the Maine House of Representatives
Women state legislators in Maine
St. Lawrence University alumni
American anti-vaccination activists
American conspiracy theorists
Year of birth missing (living people)